The New York Centaurs were an A-League professional soccer club, based in New York City. The team played only one season in 1995. The New York Fever of the USISL Pro League, debuted in 1994, playing two seasons in the league before merging with the Centaurs organization in 1996. The unified New York Fever team competed in one season in the A-League in 1996 before folding.

The Fever originally played out of Barrett Stadium on the campus of Westchester Community College in Valhalla, New York.

The Centaurs played their games at Downing Stadium on Randall's Island, the former home of the New York Cosmos.

History

The saga of the New York Centaurs/Fever began in 1994 when English businessman Bob Butler launched the first pro soccer club in the New York City area since the NASL New York Cosmos of the 1970s and 1980s. Butler founded the New York Fever as a USISL Pro League team in 1994 with the objective of building a robust franchise and soccer training center for the large and untapped population and youth of New York City. The team's coach was George Vizvary.

The New York Centaurs, owned by Roger Gorevic, debuted in 1995 at Downing Stadium to considerably small fanfare. The Centaurs started their season under coach Len Roitman, who would step down amid poor results to focus on his role as general manager, making way for former Cosmos star midfielder, Yugoslavian Vladislav Bogicevic.
The team would absorb the lower tiered New York Fever for the 1996 season and compete under the Fever name.  For the 1996 season, Goervic brought in Tom Neale to be the team's General Manager.  Neale in turn brought in Mike Winograd, his college roommate and teammate at Lafayette College, to head up ticket sales, marketing and team development.  After one season, Gorevic moved the franchise to Staten Island and tapped Neale and Winograd to start up a new team there.  The franchise was named the Staten Island Vipers, which began play in the A-League in 1998.  Neale ultimately went on to be General Manager of the San Jose Earthquakes and COO of the MetroStars of MLS. Winograd, a former professional soccer player in Kfar Saba, Israel and assistant soccer coach at the University of Richmond, went on to law school at the University of Pennsylvania.

Players

Ownership and staff
 Len Roitman – General Manager (1995–96)
 Howard Rubenstein – Director of Field Operations

Head coaches
 Len Roitman (1995)
 Vladislav Bogićević (1995–96)

A-League New York Centaurs/Fever year-by-year

Ownership and staff
 Roger Gorevic
 Bob Butler

Head coaches
 George Vizvary

USISL New York Fever year-by-year

See also

New York Cosmos
Rochester Rhinos
New York Red Bulls

References 

Centaurs
Defunct soccer clubs in New York (state)
American Professional Soccer League teams
A-League (1995–2004) teams
USISL teams
1994 establishments in New York City
1996 disestablishments in New York (state)
Association football clubs established in 1994
Association football clubs disestablished in 1996
Sports in Manhattan